Grand Township is one of the fifteen townships of Marion County, Ohio, United States.  The 2010 census found 391 people in the township.

Geography
Located in the northwestern corner of the county, it borders the following townships:
Marseilles Township, Wyandot County - north
Salt Rock Township - east
Big Island Township - southeast corner
Montgomery Township - south
Dudley Township, Hardin County - southwest corner
Goshen Township, Hardin County - west

No municipalities are located in Grand Township.

Name and history
It is the only Grand Township statewide.

Government
The township is governed by a three-member board of trustees, who are elected in November of odd-numbered years to a four-year term beginning on the following January 1. Two are elected in the year after the presidential election and one is elected in the year before it. There is also an elected township fiscal officer, who serves a four-year term beginning on April 1 of the year after the election, which is held in November of the year before the presidential election. Vacancies in the fiscal officership or on the board of trustees are filled by the remaining trustees.

References

External links
County website

Townships in Marion County, Ohio
Townships in Ohio